Tom Browne (born October 30, 1954) is an American jazz trumpeter. He rose to prominence with Sonny Fortune and had major hits in 1980 and 1981: the No. 1 Billboard magazine R&B single "Funkin' for Jamaica (N.Y.)" and the No. 4 R&B single "Thighs High (Grip Your Hips and Move)".

Discography

Studio albums

Singles

References

External links
 

1954 births
Living people
African-American jazz musicians
American dance musicians
American jazz trumpeters
American male trumpeters
Smooth jazz trumpeters
People from Queens, New York
GRP Records artists
Arista Records artists
Jazz musicians from New York (state)
21st-century trumpeters
21st-century American male musicians
American male jazz musicians